James John Bridges (28 June 1887 at Timsbury, Somerset – 26 September 1966 at  Hackney, London) was an English cricketer who played for Somerset from 1911 to 1929.

Bridges was a right-arm fast-medium bowler who batted right-handed.

He played in 216 first-class matches and took 686 wickets at an average of 25.67 with best figures of 7-41.  He achieved 5 wickets in an innings (5wI) on 45 occasions and 10 wickets in a match 4 times.

He was a tail-end batsman who played 348 innings, with 108 not outs, scoring 2418 runs @ 10.07 and having a highest score of 99*.  He made two fifties and took 128 catches.

Bridges was the bowler when Jack Hobbs scored the run that took him to his 126th career century and so equalled the then world record of W G Grace.

External sources
 CricketArchive

English cricketers
Somerset cricketers
Gentlemen cricketers
People from Timsbury, Somerset
1887 births
1966 deaths